The following is a timeline of the history of the city of Oviedo, Spain.

Prior to 20th century

 762 - Oviedo founded.(es)
 790s - Alfonso II of Asturias relocates his capital to Oviedo.
 811 - Roman Catholic diocese of Oviedo established.
 848 - San Miguel de Lillo church built on nearby Mount Naranco.
 850 - Santa María del Naranco church built on Mount Naranco.
 924 - Asturian capital relocated to León from Oviedo.
 1145 -  (law) created.
 1258 - New  construction begins.
 1388 - Oviedo Cathedral construction begins.
 1521 - Fire.
 1528 - Oviedo Cathedral tower built.
 1574 - University of Oviedo established; classes begin in 1608.
 1587
 San Isidoro Church built.
  developed.
 1670 -  (theatre) opens.
 1671 -  (town hall) built on the Plaza Mayor.
 1809 - Oviedo "plundered by the French" during the Peninsular War.
 1810 - Oviedo "plundered by the French" again.
 1842 - Population: 19,610.
 1854 - Academia de Bellas Artes de San Salvador de Oviedo (art school) active.(es)
 1874 - Oviedo railway station opens.
 1892 - Teatro Campoamor (theatre) opens.
 1900
 University's Extension Universitaria established "to educate the local working classes."
 Population: 48,103.

20th century

 1907 -  (musical group) founded.
 1923 - Astur CF (football club) formed.
 1926 - Real Oviedo (football club) formed.
 1932 - Estadio de Buenavista (stadium) opens.
 1936 - Siege of Oviedo.
 1937 - La Nueva España newspaper begins publication.
 1940 - Population: 82,548.
 1942 -  (library) established.
 1944
  (theatre) opens.
  built on the Plaza de la Escandalera.
 1950 - Population: 106,002.
 1956 -  (archives) established.
 1975 - Palacio Municipal de Deportes de Oviedo (arena) opens.
 1982 - Part of 1982 FIFA World Cup football contest held in Oviedo.
 1991 - Population: 204,276.
 2000 - New Estadio Carlos Tartiere (stadium) opens.

21st century

 2003 -  (bus depot) opens.
 2011 - Population: 225,005.
 2015 -  becomes mayor.
 2019 -  becomes mayor.
2020 - Writer Luis Sepúlveda dies in Oviedo, of COVID-19. He was the first COVID-19 case detected in Asturias.

See also
 Oviedo history
 
Other cities in the autonomous community of Asturias:(es)
 Timeline of Gijón
 List of municipalities in Asturias

References

This article incorporates information from the Spanish Wikipedia.

Bibliography

in English

in Spanish
  (includes information about Oviedo)
 F. Cañellas Secades: El libro de Oviedo: Guía de la ciudad y su concejo (Oviedo, 1887)

External links

  (city archives)
 Items related to Oviedo, various dates (via Europeana)
 Items related to Oviedo, various dates (via Digital Public Library of America)

Oviedo
Oviedo